CKHC-FM is a Canadian radio station, broadcasting at 96.9 FM in Toronto, Ontario. It is the campus radio station of the city's Humber College. CKHC's studios and transmitter are located at the Humber College's North Campus building on Humber College Boulevard.

The station was licensed by the CRTC in 2004 as a developmental FM station. CKHC was the first radio station in Canada to voluntarily adopt a 100 per cent Canadian content playlist. In 2007, the station was approved for a campus instructional license and an increase in power. It can now be heard at a radius of 10 km around the Humber North campus. The station is known on-air as 96.9 Radio Humber.

Programming includes a daily news magazine show @Humber, which airs Monday to Friday at noon and again at 6 p.m. Jazz from Humber's renowned music program at 8 a.m. and midnight, along with a daily sports show, Humber Sportsdrive at 5:30 p.m.

References 

2013-665 CRTC Decision regarding the Broadcast license of CKHC-FM

External links 
 Radio Humber
 
 

Khc
Khc
Humber College
Radio stations established in 2004
2004 establishments in Ontario